Trioctylamine is a clear and colorless chemical compound in the group of aliphatic amines and tertiary amines.

Physical and chemical properties 
It is a clear colorless method and can be converted to the amine hydrochloride etherate which is recrystallized four times from diethyl ether at -30 °C. Neutralization of this salt regenerates the free amine which distilled under high vacuum. It has melting point of −34 °C; boiling point of 164-168 °C at 0.7 mmHg and 365-367 °C at 1 atm; density of 0.810 g/mL at 20 °C; refractive index of n20/D 1.449; flash point of >230 °F; storage temperature is below 30 °C. It can easily soluble in chloroform; it has a form of low melting crystalline mass, and it has the color of white to off-white. It is miscible with chloroform but immiscible with water. It is air sensitive. There is a safety hazard for this chemical compound. It can cause skin irritation, serious eye irritation, and respiratory irritation. It can damage fertility or the unborn child and cause damage to organs through prolonged or repeated exposure. It is very toxic to aquatic life with long lasting effects.

Application 
Trioctylamine is used to extract organic acids such as succinic acid and acetic acid, and also precious metals. A formulation containing metoxuron mixed with an emulsion containing trioctylamine 50%, atlox 4851 B 15%, and isopropanol 35% was active as a potato defoliant. Trioctylamine can be used to extract monocarboxylic acid for equilibria and correlation of apparent reactive equilibrium constant. Liquid-liquid equilibria for aqueous solutions of carboxylic acids with trioctylamine in various diluents was determined at various trioctylamine concentrations. The loading of trioctylamine for a given carboxylic acid depends on the nature of the solute and its concentration. The apparent extraction equilibrium constants depend on the hydrophobicity and acidity of the carboxylic acid, as well as the specific basicity of trioctylamine.  Trioctylamine production can be used as a mineral extraction reagent, an extractant for reactor fuel processing, and its use as an extractant for identification of dyes may result in its release to the environment through various waste streams.

External links 

Alkylamines
Tertiary amines